Victor Junior Lindskog (December 3, 1914 – February 28, 2003) was an American football offensive lineman in the NFL for the Philadelphia Eagles.

Background
Victor J. Lindskog was born in Roundup, Montana. He played college football at Stanford University. He died in Fort Worth, Texas in 2003.

Career
Following his playing career, Lindskog was an assistant coach for the Eagles and the Los Angeles Rams, and then was a football scout for 40 years. He also served as an assistant coach at the University of Maryland under Hall of Fame inductee Clark Shaughnessy.

References

External links

Philadelphia Eagles players
Philadelphia Eagles coaches
Los Angeles Rams coaches
Stanford Cardinal football players
Maryland Terrapins football coaches
American football offensive linemen
1914 births
2003 deaths
People from Roundup, Montana
Players of American football from Montana